ABC Television is the general name for the national television services of the Australian Broadcasting Corporation (ABC). Until an organisational restructure in 2017/2018, ABC Television was also the name of a division of the ABC. The name was also used to refer to the first and for many years the only national ABC channel, before it was renamed ABC1 and then again to ABC TV.

The Australian public broadcaster's television service was launched in November 1956 from its first television station in Australia,  ABN Sydney. This was the second one in the country, with the commercial channel TCN having launched two months earlier. An ABC television network covering every state and territory was completed by 1971, and in 2000 the television operations joined the ABC radio and online divisions at the Corporation's Ultimo headquarters in Sydney in 2000.

The ABC  provides five non-commercial channels within Australia, headed by its flagship ABC TV channel, as well as ABC Australia, a satellite channel broadcast to South-East Asia, partially funded by the Department of Foreign Affairs and Trade and advertisers. Some radio channels are also broadcast via the television network. The ABC local stations in the capital cities carry opt-outs for local programming, used chiefly for nightly news broadcasts. ABC Television also broadcasts via its streaming and video-on-demand service, ABC iview, available via its website and a mobile app.

ABC Television is one of five main free-to-air networks in Australia.

History

1950s to 2000

The history of the ABC's television operations can be traced back to 1953, when the federal Television Act was passed, providing the initial regulatory framework for both the ABC and commercial television networks. Over the next three years, planning for the introduction of a national television service was put in place, land for studios and transmitters in Sydney and Melbourne was acquired, and overseas tutors were brought to Australia to assist with training. The ABC's 1956 Annual Report stated that it aimed to create a “television service as truly national in character as its resources will permit”.

Commercial station TCN-9 Sydney was the first to broadcast in Australia, in September 1956. The ABC's Sydney station, ABN, started transmission on 5 November 1956. Its first television broadcast was inaugurated by Prime Minister Robert Menzies at the Gore Hill studios in Sydney, and a couple of weeks later, ABV transmission began in Melbourne on 19 November 1956, in time to cover the 1956 Summer Olympics in Melbourne.

Outside broadcasting was also initiated on 5 November, from the ABC's first outside broadcast van. The van, now in the collection of the National Museum of Australia, was instrumental in the production of thousands of outside broadcasts. It was restored in time to be displayed at the Sydney Olympic Games and was used to film the visit of Queen Elizabeth II to the site of the National Museum in 2000.

ABQ in Brisbane was the third ABC TV station to launch, in November 1959; it was followed in 1960 by counterparts in Perth (ABW), Hobart (ABT), and Adelaide (ABS). ABC (also known as ABC3) opened in Canberra in 1962, with (ABD) in Darwin (13 August 1971) finally completing the ABC's television coverage of every state in 1971.

Although radio programs could be broadcast nationally by landline, television relay facilities were not put in place until the early 1960s. This meant that news bulletins had to be sent to each capital city by teleprinter, to be prepared and presented separately in each city, with filmed materials copied manually and sent to each state. A purpose-built television studio was built in Sydney, and opened on 29 January 1958, replacing temporary sound studios used since the ABC's television services launched in 1956. In the same year, technical equipment was also moved to permanent locations, while main transmitters were introduced to Melbourne and Sydney in 1957 and 1958, respectively.

Direct television relays between Sydney and Melbourne were established in 1961, replacing temporary microwave relays as a means of simultaneously airing programs across multiple stations. In 1963, using microwave transmission as a temporary measure, television programs from Adelaide were viewed simultaneously across the four eastern capitals. Videotape equipment, allowing the sharing of footage with much greater ease and speed, was installed in each state capital by 1962.

The organisational structure and internal processes of the network developed and changed over time, with local coverage incorporated in a network structure, which allowed the ABC to build state-based audiences for coverage of sports and news. Live coverage of sports was still limited to the location of the studio, for example for the West Indies cricket series in 1960/61, live broadcasts were limited to the four cities which hosted the test matches. It was only after considerable developments in technology and construction of further infrastructure, that in 1970/71 that test cricket was broadcast live in every state and the ACT.

Colour television was introduced in Australia on 1 March 1975.

Teletext services were introduced to ABC TV in 1983 to allow hearing-impaired viewers access to closed captions. International television service Australia Television International was established in 1993. Australia Television was sold to the Seven Network in 1998; however, the service continued to show content from ABC News until its closure in 2001.

Programming
ABC Television was one of the first television networks in Australia to embrace the rock 'n roll revolution of the late 1950s, most notably with Six O'Clock Rock, hosted by Johnny O'Keefe. During the 1960s and early 1970s the channel continued to broadcast programmes on popular music, including the pop show Hitscene, performance specials by groups such as Tully and Max Merritt & The Meteors, as well as the magazine-style programme GTK, which premiered in 1969 and screened for 10 minutes, four nights per week at 6:30 pm, immediately prior to Bellbird and the 7:00 pm news bulletin. The hugely popular rock music program, Countdown began in 1974, produced at ABC Melbourne's Ripponlea studios and hosted by Ian 'Molly' Meldrum, and ran until 1987.

The weekly current affairs program Four Corners was broadcast from Sydney from 1961, and in 1967, the weeknightly television current affairs programme This Day Tonight began.

In 1989, Aboriginal dancers Lillian Crombie and Malcolm Cole were the first co-presenters for Blackout, a program developed for Aboriginal and Torres Strait Islander audiences.

2000 to present
The ABC's television operations joined its radio and online divisions at the corporation's Ultimo headquarters in 2000.

In 2001 a new logo was launched, featuring a modification to a three-dimensional metallic design, to celebrate the introduction of digital terrestrial television in Australia, when digital television was introduced to most of the network's coverage area on 1 January 2001, soon followed by the gradual introduction of widescreen and high definition programming. Between 2001 and 2003, the ABC operated two separate digital channels, ABC Kids and Fly TV, which opened soon after the launch of DTV.

In 2002, the ABC launched ABC Asia Pacific (now ABC Australia), the replacement for the defunct Australia Television channel operated previously by the Seven Network. Much like its predecessor, and companion radio network Radio Australia, the service provided a mix of programming targeted at audiences throughout the Asia-Pacific region. Funding cuts in 2003, meanwhile, led to the closure of Fly and the ABC Kid's Channel.

Also in 2002, to celebrate 70 years of the Australian Broadcasting Corporation, ABC TV's logo reverted to the "over and under" design seen in the previous decades; however it retained the three-dimensional metallic design. The channel's idents featured elements – fire, leaf and ice, and the slogan was updated to Everyone's ABC. The idents also featured the silver ring that morphs into the ABC logo. This however did not last, as later in 2003, the channel's idents were modified to feature everyday Australians.

In 2005, the ABC switched from the Supertext logo to their own closed captioning logo. On 19 December that year, the channel's idents were revamped featuring a modified ABC logo transforming to a television.

ABC2, a second attempt at a digital-only television channel, was launched on 7 March 2005, running on a budget of $3 million per year. Minister for Communications Helen Coonan inaugurated the channel at Parliament House three days later. Genre restrictions limiting the types of programming the channel could carry were lifted in October 2006; ABC2 was henceforth able to carry programming classified as comedy, drama, national news, sport and entertainment.

The ABC Guide was a regular television broadcast shown during the off-air periods for both ABC HD and ABC2 on their respective channels. It was launched on 30 May 2006 and was initially available in Sydney, with all other digital ABC broadcast regions launching the guide at a later date. The channel provided a live audio-stream of DiG Radio, and also provided weather reports. The guide advertised new and popular television programs from both channels via informational slides. The design and colour scheme were based on ABC Online's branding of the time, with the use of light blue, orange, and white, with each slide using elements from the respective channel's on-air branding. It was removed from channel 20 on 1 January 2008 when ABC HD relaunched as a full-time simulcast of ABC TV, and closed on 8 February 2008 when ABC2 was moved from channel 21 to channel 22 and began 24-hour broadcasting.

In the lead-up to the 2007 federal election, the Australian Government (then Liberal) endorsed a proposal submitted to the Australian Communications and Media Authority by the ABC to launch a second digital channel targeted at children. The new channel, titled ABC Me, was to aim to provide at least 50% Australian-made content for children under 15. Unlike its predecessor, the ABC Kids channel, ABC Me would run from 6am to 9pm each day, and feature drama, comedy, animation and music. On 22 April 2009, the Labor government announced its commitment to the proposal as part of its response to the Australia 2020 Summit conducted in 2008, and ABC Me was launched on 4 December.

At midday on 8 February 2008, the original ABC Television channel was rebranded as ABC1, complementing the existing ABC2 ( ABC TV Plus) digital-only channel launched on 7 March 2005.

As of 2009, ABC announced an Australia-wide upgrade to its digital service, and that it would provide a seven-day Electronic Program Guide (EPG) and give new logical channel numbers for all of ABC's television services.

June 2010 saw ABC1's ABC HD, the high definition digital TV channel, terminated, to be replaced with a fourth channel, ABC News 24 (now ABC News). In  the same month playout was moved to a new facility shared with WIN Television at Ingleburn.

On 20 July 2014, ABC1 changed its name back to just "ABC TV" and at the same time, they introduced new idents featuring the 1975 Lissajous curve logo being drawn by itself of videos of people doing activities (taken from ABC Open's video library). Then, the words "It's (Insert Words Here)'s ABC" (the words change depending on the ident) fade in on the left side of the logo. The words then change to "#OurABC", which is the network's new slogan. In 2018, these idents were updated. The "#OurABC" slogan at the end of each ident was changed to "Yours". The new 2014 idents are all very similar to that of the 1996–1998, 1998–2000, 2003–2005, 2008–2011 and 2011-2014 ABC station idents in the past.

On 6 December 2016, ABC upgraded its HD picture resolution from 720p to 1080i.

Between July 2017 and June 2018, the whole of the ABC underwent an organisational restructure, after which the Radio and Television Divisions were no longer separate entities each under a director, instead being split across several functional divisions, with different teams producing different genres of content for television, radio and digital platforms. The Entertainment & Specialist (E&S) team focussed on comedy, kids' programs, drama, Indigenous-related programs, music, other entertainment and factual content; the new ABC Specialist team created content across the arts, science, religion & ethics, education and society & culture; while the Regional & Local team focussed on regional and local content.

The 1975 ABC logo was reinstated in February 2019. On 3 September 2019, several additional ABC Digital Radio channels were added to complement the ABC Jazz and Double J services being simulcast on digital TV.

Services

Australia

National

Within Australia, the ABC  operates five television stations within four channels, all of them non-commercial. These services are available nationally through digital terrestrial television, and all the digital TV services are also available through the VAST free-to-air satellite service.

ABC TV, the Corporation's original television service, receives the bulk of funding for television and shows first-run comedy, drama, documentaries, and news and current affairs. In each state and territory a local news bulletin is shown at 7pm nightly.
ABC TV Plus (originally ABC2), launched in 2005, shows comedic content in addition to some repeats from ABC TV. It is not a 24-hour channel, but is broadcast daily from 7.30pm to late.
ABC TV Plus shares airspace with the ABC Kids programming block from 5am to 7.30pm. (Children's TV was previously catered for on ABC1 and ABC2, as ABC For Kids on 2 and ABC 4 Kids.)
ABC Me (originally ABC3) became a fully fledged channel on 4 December 2009, but has been part of the electronic guide line-up since 2008, broadcasting an ABC1 simulcast until 4 December 2009, then an ABC Radio simulcast and teaser graphic until its official launch. It is broadcast from 5.30am to 10 or before 11pm daily, and consists of a broad range programmes aimed at a young audience aged 6–15, with a core demographic of 8–12.
ABC News (originally ABC News 24), a 24-hour news channel, featuring the programming from ABC News and Current Affairs, selected programs from the BBC World News channel and Deutsche Welle, coverage of the Federal Parliament's Question Time, documentaries and factual, arts programming and state or national election coverage.

State-based programming

Although the ABC's headquarters in Sydney serve as a base for program distribution nationally, ABC Television network is composed of eight state- and territory-based centres, once separate stations with their own branding. In addition to the nightly 7pm news, the stations used to broadcast weekly state editions of 7.30 on Friday evenings (until 5 December 2014), state election coverage and in most areas, live sport on Saturday and Sunday evenings.

ABC iview

ABC iview is a video on demand and catch up TV service, which became available on 24 July 2008. This was the next step after the podcasting of radio programmes from July 2006. Iview can only be viewed by users in Australia. The iview website streams video at 650kbit/s in the H.264 format, and uses the RTMP protocol, which makes it accessible to web browsers installed with Adobe Flash. Iview is also available through native apps for iOS and Android smartphones, tablets, and HDMI devices, as well as on some brands of internet-connected TVs. These use a HTTP stream to deliver video to the client.

Overseas 

ABC Australia is an international satellite television service operated by the ABC, funded by advertising and grants from the Department of Foreign Affairs and Trade. The service is available via subscription to viewers across East Asia, Central Asia, South Asia, South-East Asia and Pacific Islands, including India, Japan, Vietnam, Afghanistan, the Philippines, Papua New Guinea and Vanuatu, and broadcasts a mixture of English-language programming, including general entertainment, sport, and current affairs.

Funding
ABC television services within Australia carry no advertising by external sources; it is banned under the Australian Broadcasting Corporation Act 1983, which also ensures its the editorial independence. The ABC receives its most of its funding from the Australian Government (some revenue is earned by ABC Commercial), but has suffered progressive funding cuts under Liberal governments since the 1996 Howard government, with particularly deep cuts in 2014 under the Abbott government, and an ongoing indexation freeze .

ABC Australia, which broadcasts throughout the Asia-Pacific region,  receives additional funds through DFAT and some advertising on the channel.

See also

Children's programming on ABC Television

References

Further reading

External links 
 
 

Commercial-free television networks in Australia
Australian Broadcasting Corporation television
Australian Broadcasting Corporation divisions
Mass media companies established in 1956
1956 establishments in Australia
Articles containing video clips